DelJuan Cortez Robinson (born July 1, 1984) is a former American football defensive tackle. He was originally signed by the Texans as an undrafted free agent in 2007. He played college football at Mississippi State. He was raised in Hernando, Mississippi, and played for their high school.

External links
Houston Texans bio

1984 births
Living people
People from Memphis, Tennessee
American football defensive tackles
Mississippi State Bulldogs football players
Houston Texans players
Carolina Panthers players
People from Hernando, Mississippi